San Juan Bautista, capital of the Department of Misiones, Paraguay, is considered the cradle of the religious mission culture.  The city is the seat of the Roman Catholic Diocese of San Juan Bautista de las Misiones.

Geography

San Juan Bautista Misiones is located 196 kilometers south of Asunción. One can travel to the city by following the Route 1st “Mcal. Francisco Solano López”.

Climate

In summer, the maximum temperature is 42 degrees Celsius. The minimum temperature in winter is zero degrees Celsius. The annual average is 21 degrees Celsius.

Demography
With a total area of 2,300 square kilometers, San Juan Bautista has a population of 18,441 inhabitants, 9,281 male and 9,161 female, according to projections of the General Office of Statistics, Surveys and Censuses. The city is the third most populated one in Misiones, after San Ignacio and Ayolas.

History

This city was established during the government of Carlos Antonio López, declared a small town in 1893, and in 1945 was made the capital of the department.

Economy

San Juan Bautista is an agricultural and livestock area. It produces soy, wheat, cotton, rice and corn. livestock is also important there.

Te Guaraní- natural products for health life style.
Distribuidora Pilar -Wholesale Company of household cleaning Staff.

Tourism

Important educational institutions, como el colegio diocesano misionero government institutions, the bishopric, and health centers are located in the city. The church is a Jesuit style relic.

There are springs and streams in the city. At Lilly's Island, in San Cristobal, a diversity of these flowers may be seen.

During the holidays honoring the city's patron saint,  Saint John the Baptist, processions, riding on horseback, colt taming, and bullfights are held. Some typical foods eaten then are batiburrillo, asado a la estaca and caburé.

In January, the party of Siriki is celebrated.

The house of Mangoré, today a museum and a cultural center, is frequented by tourists.

Other interesting locations in the vicinity are:
The art gallery “El Viejo Taller”
The “Monseñor Rojas” Theater
Seminario Diocesano San José
The Boquerón square, with a fountain in its center
The pyramids constructed honoring the veterans of the Chaco War and the country

Transportation

Beyond San Juan Bautista, an unpaved road goes to Santa María. Another road also goes to Route 4th and to Pilar in Ñeembucú.

People of San Juan Bautista

Agustín Pío Barrios, guitarist.
Gustavo Gómez, footballer.

Gallery

Twin towns
San Juan Bautista, Paraguay  is twinned with:
 Luque, Paraguay
 San Juan, Argentina

References

Geografía Ilustrada del Paraguay, Distribuidora Arami SRL; 2007. 
Geografía del Paraguay, Primera Edición 1999, Editorial Hispana Paraguay SRL

External links
 Secretaria Nacional de Turismo
 ABC Digital "Así es Nuestro País" MISIONES (VIII Departamento)

Populated places in the Misiones Department